Ansarul Islamic Girls Secondary School (AIGSS) is a government-sponsored secondary school located in Tankoro Chiefdom, Koidutown, Kono District, Sierra Leone. It was founded in 1974 on Islamic Principle as part of the Sierra Leone Ansarul Islamic Mission (SLAIM), by two Fulani Philanthropists, Alhaji Sajalieu Bah and Alhaji Chewtor Jalloh, as an all-girls secondary school. Although the school has an Islamic tradition, students from all religious background are accepted. The teaching staff is made up of teachers from different religious background.

 Former Principals include: Isatu Sillah

Islamic schools in Sierra Leone
Girls' schools in Sierra Leone
1974 establishments in Sierra Leone
Educational institutions established in 1974
Islamic secondary schools in Africa
Koidu